Michael Skals Søgaard (born 4 February 1969) is a badminton player from Denmark.

Career
Søgaard made his debut at the national team in 1992. Since then he has won many tournaments for Denmark. Played for the Kastrup-Magleby BK, he has won ten National Championships titles, three bronze medals at the World Championships, and won the mixed doubles title at the World Grand Prix Finals.

Summer Olympics
He played badminton at the 1996 Summer Olympics in men's doubles and mixed doubles. In men's doubles, Søgaard and his partner Henrik Svarrer were defeated in the round of 16 by Ricky Subagja and Rexy Mainaky of Indonesia 15-10, 15-7. He also competed in mixed doubles with partner Rikke Olsen. They were defeated in quarterfinals by Chen Xingdong and Peng Xingyong of China 15-10, 6-15, 18-15.

He also competed in badminton at the 2000 Summer Olympics in men's doubles and mixed doubles. In men's doubles, Søgaard and his partner Jim Laugesen were defeated in the round of 16 by Tony Gunawan and Candra Wijaya of Indonesia 15-9, 15-7. He also competed in mixed doubles with partner Rikke Olsen. They reached the semifinals and they were defeated by Zhang Jun and Gao Ling of China 10-15, 15-6, 17-16. They also lost the bronze medal match against Simon Archer and Joanne Goode of Great Britain 15-4, 12-15, 17-14.

Titles
Søgaard won the European Badminton Championships four consecutive times in mixed doubles. In 1994 with Catrine Bengtsson of Sweden, and in 1996, 1998 and 2000 with Rikke Olsen.

Achievements

World Championships 
Mixed doubles

World Cup 
Men's doubles

Mixed doubles

European Championships 
Men's doubles

Mixed doubles

European Junior Championships 
Boys' singles

Boys' doubles

IBF World Grand Prix
The World Badminton Grand Prix sanctioned by International Badminton Federation (IBF) since 1983.

Men's doubles

Mixed doubles

IBF International
Men's singles

Men's doubles

Mixed doubles

References

External links 
 

1969 births
Living people
People from Sønderborg Municipality
Danish male badminton players
Badminton players at the 1996 Summer Olympics
Badminton players at the 2000 Summer Olympics
Olympic badminton players of Denmark
Sportspeople from the Region of Southern Denmark